Osman Mohammed (Arabic:عثمان محمد) (born 25 September 1987) is a Sudanese footballer. He played in the Qatar Stars League for Qatar SC.

References

Sudanese footballers
Expatriate footballers in Qatar
Sudanese expatriate footballers
Sudanese expatriate sportspeople in Qatar
1987 births
Living people
Al-Khor SC players
El Jaish SC players
Qatar SC players
Al Ahli SC (Doha) players
Qatar Stars League players
Association football defenders